Derek Anderson (born February 20, 1990) is an American mixed martial artist, currently signed to Bellator MMA, competing in the Welterweight division.

Mixed martial arts career

Early career
Anderson began training in mixed martial arts at the age of 19, and later made his professional mixed martial arts debut in 2011. Anderson compiled an undefeated record of 9-0 with one no contest before being signed by Bellator.

Bellator MMA
Anderson made his promotional debut against Patricky Freire at Bellator 98 on September 7, 2013. Anderson won via unanimous decision.

Anderson was then scheduled to face Terry Etim in the quarterfinals of the Bellator Season Ten Lightweight Tournament on March 21, 2014 at Bellator 113. Etim then pulled out due to an ACL injury. Etim was replaced by Brandon Girtz. Anderson won via knockout due to a knee strike in the second round.

In the semifinals, Anderson faced Polish submission specialist Marcin Held at Bellator 117 on April 18, 2014. Anderson was handed his first professional loss via triangle choke submission in the second round.

Anderson faced Danny Navarro on January 16, 2015 at Bellator 132. He won the fight via TKO in the third round.

Anderson next faced Brent Primus at Bellator 141 on August 28, 2015.  He lost the fight by split decision.

In the first rematch of his career, Anderson faced Patricky Freire for a second time on December 4, 2015 at Bellator 147. He again won the fight, this time by split decision.

A welterweight bout between Anderson and Paul Daley at Bellator 163 was scrapped on the day of the event after Daley fell ill from effects of his weight cut.

Anderson faced Saad Awad at Bellator 160 on August 26, 2016. In a back-and-forth affair, in which both fighters traded near submission finishes, Anderson ultimately won the fight via unanimous decision.

Anderson faced Derek Campos at Bellator 170 on January 21, 2017. He lost the fight via unanimous decision.

Anderson was expected to face Michael Page at Bellator 179 on May 19, 2017 but Page suffered a knee injury and neck injury. No replacement opponent was sought.

Anderson was expected to return against Adam Piccolotti at Bellator 189 on December 1, 2017. However, an injury to Anderson forced him out of the bout and he was replaced by David Rickels.

Anderson made his welterweight debut against Guilherme Bomba on October 4, 2019 at Bellator 229. He won via unanimous decision.

Anderson was expected to headline Bellator London 2 against Michael Page on 23 November 2019 but Anderson withdrew for undisclosed reasons on 12 November 2019.

Anderson was then scheduled again to face Paul Daley at Bellator 247 on October 1, 2020. However, Daley was not unable to make weight and was hospitalized, leading to the bout being scrapped.

Anderson faced Killys Mota on November 5 at Bellator 251. He won the bout via second round knockout.

Anderson faced Michael Page at Bellator 258 on May 7, 2021. Anderson was supposed to fight Page twice before at Bellator 179 and Bellator London 2. Towards the end of the first round, Page landed a kick to Anderson's face which badly broke his nose to the point it was completely flattened, leading to the doctor stopping the fight between rounds.

He was suspended 120 days (4 months) by the Mohegan Sun Department of Athletic Regulation for falsifying his pre-fight medical forms after Anderson failed to disclose that he went to the hospital four times for kidney failure during his fight camp.

Anderson was scheduled to face Goiti Yamauchi on March 12, 2022 at Bellator 276. The week of the event, the bout was scrapped for unknown reasons.

Mixed martial arts record

|-
|Loss
|align=center|17–4 (1)
|Michael Page
|TKO (doctor stoppage)
|Bellator 258
|
|align=center|1
|align=center|5:00
|Uncasville, Connecticut, United States
|
|-
|Win
|align=center|17–3 (1)
|Killys Mota
|KO (head kick)
|Bellator 251
|
|align=center|2
|align=center|4:27
|Uncasville, Connecticut, United States
|
|-
|Win
|align=center|16–3 (1)
|Guilherme Bomba	
|Decision (unanimous)
|Bellator 229
|
|align=center|3
|align=center|5:00
|Temecula, California, United States
|
|-
|Win
|align=center|15–3 (1)
|Zak Bucia
|Decision (unanimous)
|Bellator 197
|
|align=center|3
|align=center|5:00
|St. Charles, Missouri, United States
|
|-
|Loss
|align=center|14–3 (1)
|Derek Campos
|Decision (unanimous)
|Bellator 170
|
|align=center|3
|align=center|5:00
|Inglewood, California, United States
|
|-
|Win
|align=center|14–2 (1)
|Saad Awad
|Decision (unanimous)
|Bellator 160
|
|align=center|3
|align=center|5:00
|Anaheim, California, United States
|
|-
|Win
|align=center|13–2 (1)
|Patricky Pitbull
|Decision (split)
|Bellator 147
|
|align=center|3
|align=center|5:00
|San Jose, California, United States
|
|-
|Loss
|align=center|12–2 (1)
|Brent Primus
|Decision (split)
|Bellator 141
|
|align=center|3
|align=center|5:00
|Temecula, California, United States
|
|-
|Win
|align=center|12–1 (1)
|Danny Navarro
|TKO (punches)
|Bellator 132
|
|align=center|3
|align=center|3:51
|Temecula, California, United States
|
|-
|Loss
|align=center|11–1 (1)
|Marcin Held
|Submission (triangle choke)
|Bellator 117
|
|align=center|2
|align=center|3:09
|Council Bluffs, Iowa, United States
|
|-
|Win
|align=center|11–0 (1)
|Brandon Girtz
|KO (knee)
|Bellator 113
|
|align=center|2
|align=center|0:23
|Mulvane, Kansas, United States
|
|-
|Win
|align=center|10–0 (1)
|Patricky Pitbull
|Decision (unanimous)
|Bellator 98
|
|align=center|3
|align=center|5:00
|Uncasville, Connecticut, United States
|
|-
|Win
|align=center|9–0 (1)
|Craig Flynn
|TKO (punches) 
|Xplode Fight Series: Aftermath
|
|align=center|1
|align=center|0:48
|San Pasqual Indian Reservation, California United States
|
|-
|Win
|align=center|8–0 (1)
|Ray Carter
|Submission (armbar)
|Xplode Fight Series: Revancha
|
|align=center|2
|align=center|1:02
|San Pasqual Indian Reservation, California, United States
|
|-
|NC
|align=center|7–0 (1)
|Aaron Neveu
|No Contest (overturned) 
|Xplode Fight Series: Damage
|
|align=center|1
|align=center|2:06
|San Pasqual Indian Reservation, California, United States
|
|-
|Win
|align=center|7–0
|Edward Darby
|Submission (armbar)
|Xplode Fight Series: Anarchy
|
|align=center|1
|align=center|1:06
|San Pasqual Indian Reservation, California, United States
|
|-
|Win
|align=center|6–0
|Kris Armbrister
|Submission (guillotine choke)
|Xplode Fight Series: Eclipse
|
|align=center|1
|align=center|2:56
|San Pasqual Indian Reservation, California, United States
|
|-
|Win
|align=center|5–0
|Dino Valdez
|Submission (guillotine choke)
|Xplode Fight Series: Disarm
|
|align=center|1
|align=center|0:26
|San Pasqual Indian Reservation, California, United States
|
|-
|Win
|align=center|4–0
|Jeremy Michur
|TKO (knee)
|Xplode Fight Series: Brutal Conduct
|
|align=center|1
|align=center|1:40
|San Pasqual Indian Reservation, California, United States
|
|-
|Win
|align=center|3–0
|Chris Mercado
|TKO (punches)
|Gladiator Challenge: Season's Beatings 3
|
|align=center|2
|align=center|N/A
|San Jacinto, California, United States
|
|-
|Win
|align=center|2–0
|Dominique Chisem
|Submission (guillotine choke)
|Xplode Fight Series: Hillside Havoc
|
|align=center|1
|align=center|N/A
|San Pasqual Indian Reservation, California, United States
|
|-
|Win
|align=center|1–0
|Leo Franklin
|Submission (rear-naked choke)
|Xplode Fight Series: Rumble off the Reservation
|
|align=center|3
|align=center|2:42
|San Pasqual Indian Reservation, California, United States
|

See also
 List of current Bellator fighters
 List of male mixed martial artists

References

External links
 

Living people
1990 births
American male mixed martial artists
Lightweight mixed martial artists